The Rère is a  long river in the Cher and Loir-et-Cher departments in central France. Its source is at Presly. It flows generally west. It is a left tributary of the Sauldre, into which it flows at Villeherviers.

Departments and communes along its course
This list is ordered from source to mouth: 
 Cher: Presly, Ménétréol-sur-Sauldre, Nançay, 
 Loir-et-Cher: Theillay, La Ferté-Imbault, Châtres-sur-Cher, Selles-Saint-Denis, Langon, Villeherviers,

References

Rivers of France
Rivers of Loir-et-Cher
Rivers of Cher (department)
Rivers of Centre-Val de Loire